The 2016 NCAA Division II Men's Lacrosse Championship is the 32nd annual single-elimination tournament to determine the national champions of NCAA Division II men's college lacrosse in the United States. The championship game will be played at Lincoln Financial Field in Philadelphia, Pennsylvania on May 29, 2016. All other matches will be played at campus sites, always at the home field of the higher-seeded team, from May 14 to 22.

LeMoyne defeated defending-champions Limestone in the final, 8−4, to win their fifth national title.

Qualification
All Division II men's lacrosse programs were eligible for this championship. A total of eight teams were invited: the top four teams from the Division II lacrosse's North and South Regions.

Bracket

Note: An asterisk marks the host team

See also
NCAA Division I Men's Lacrosse Championship
NCAA Division III Men's Lacrosse Championship
NCAA Division II Women's Lacrosse Championship

References

NCAA Division II Men's Lacrosse Championship
Ncaa Division II Men's Lacrosse Championship
NCAA Division I Men's Lacrosse
Sports in Philadelphia